Skin Deep is a 1995 film directed by Canadian filmmaker Midi Onodera and starring Natsuko Ohama, Melanie Nicholls-King, and Keram Malicki-Sánchez.

Plot
Skin Deep tells the story of an award-winning director, Alex Koyama (Natsuko Ohama), who is in the process of making a film about the tattoo industry, and the love and obsession that can arise in the "skin art" culture.  Conflict develops between Koyama and her lesbian lover / assistant, Montana (Melanie Nicholls-King) when Koyama hires a new production assistant, Chris (Keram Malicki-Sánchez), who is transgender and quickly becomes obsessed with Koyama.

Production
Skin Deep was written, directed, and co-produced by Onodera.  It was produced in cooperation with the National Film Board of Canada, with funding from
 the Canada Council
 the Ontario Arts Council
 Canadian Heritage: Multiculturalism Program
 National Association of Japanese Canadians
 Racial Equity Fund – OFDC & LIFT
 the Toronto Lesbian & Gay Appeal

Reception
Skin Deep was awarded the Best Feature Film: Audience Award at the 1995 Hamburg International Lesbian & Gay Film Festival.

See also 
 List of LGBT films directed by women

References

External links
 Skin Deep at Midi Onodera's personal website

1995 films
1995 LGBT-related films
Canadian drama films
English-language Canadian films
Canadian LGBT-related films
LGBT-related drama films
Films about Japanese Canadians
National Film Board of Canada films
Films about tattooing
Transgender-related films
1995 drama films
1990s English-language films
1990s Canadian films